Jordan Gabriel is the name of:

Jordan Gabriel (footballer)
Jordan Gabriel (musician)